Cadia is a genus of flowering plants in the family Fabaceae. It belongs to the subfamily Faboideae.

Unlike most plants in the Faboideae, it has radially symmetrical flowers. In related species with bilateral symmetry, such as those of Lupinus, the dorsal (upper or adaxial) part of the flower expresses one or more genes in the Cycloidea (CYC)/Dichotoma (DICH) family.  In Cadia, these genes are expressed throughout the flower.  Thus, from a molecular point of view, Cadia is not reversing the ancestral evolution from radial symmetry to bilateral symmetry, but obtaining radial symmetry from a new mechanism.

References

Podalyrieae
Fabaceae genera